The blanketing effect (also referred to as line blanketing or the line-blanketing effect) is the enhancement of the red or infrared regions of a stellar spectrum at the expense of the other regions, with an overall diminishing effect on the whole spectrum. The term originates in a 1928 article by astrophysicist Edward Arthur Milne, where it was used to describe the effects that the astronomical metals in a star's outer regions had on that star's spectrum. The name arose because the absorption lines act as a "blanket", causing the continuum temperature of the spectrum to rise over what it would have been if these lines were not present.

Astronomical metals, which produce most of a star's spectral absorption lines, absorb a fraction of the star's radiant energy (a phenomenon known as the blocking effect) and then re-emit it at a lower frequency as part of the backwarming effect. The combination of both these effects results in the position of stars in a color-color diagram to shift towards redder areas as the proportion of metals in them increases. The blanketing effect is thus highly dependent on the metallicity index of a star, which indicates the fraction of elements other than hydrogen and helium that compose it.

References

External links 
 "Line-Blanketing Effects on the uvbyβ Photometric System"; McNamara, D. H. & Colton, D. J. (1969)
 The Treatment of Line Blanketing
 
 Metallicity and the spectral energy distribution of O stars; Martín-Hernández, N. L., Mokiem, M. R., de Koter, A. & Tielens, A. G. G. M. (2002)
 Line Blanketing, Oxford Articles, May 2013

Astronomy